Paul Francis Sanchez Yates is an American filmmaker, artist, and musician.

Yates attended NYU for photography, received a BFA in film from SUNY Purchase in 1993 and received his M.F.A. in directing from AFI Conservatory in 2006.

Yates began working in the film industry at age 9. Despite losing his family and becoming homeless at 15, Yates has made music videos or shot footage for Moby, R.E.M., The Dandy Warhols and others. Yates attended NYU for photography, received a Bachelor of Fine Arts (BFA) in film from SUNY Purchase in 1993, and received his MFA in directing from AFI Conservatory in 2006. Yates's films have screened in festivals in Berlin, Havana, Singapore, and Tribeca, among others. Yates was the director of photography on the feature documentary Modulations, which screened at Sundance Film Festival. Yates's first directed feature, Moby Presents: Alien Sex Party was released in 2003. Yates's AFI thesis film Onion Underwater was a 2007 Tribeca Film Festival selection.

His German pop star alter ego Schaumgummi has had several pop hits in Germany. Yates was Moby's keyboardist during his live shows during the 1990s. Yates has performed at Woodstock 1999 and the Late Show with David Letterman. He did an extensive shadowing of the writers and director for the TV series Battlestar Galactica. He was also a pilot for the Red Bull Flugtag event in New York City in 2003. Yates is the founder of The International Surrealist Film Festival.

Filmography

References

External links
 

American filmmakers
Living people
Year of birth missing (living people)
American musicians
American artists
American screenwriters